Mantell's moa (Pachyornis geranoides) also known as Mappin's moa is an extinct species of moa from the North Island of New Zealand. Its habitat was the lowlands (shrublands, grasslands, dunelands, and forests). The moa were ratites, flightless birds with a sternum without a keel. They also have a distinctive palate. The origin of the ratites is becoming clearer as it is now believed that early ancestors of these birds were able to fly and flew to the southern areas that they have been found in.

Its name is in honour of New Zealand naturalist and politician Walter Mantell.

Footnotes

References
 
 

Extinct flightless birds
Extinct birds of New Zealand
Ratites
Bird extinctions since 1500
Holocene extinctions
Late Quaternary prehistoric birds
Birds described in 1848